James Buchanan Hays (September 10, 1838May 31, 1888) was an American attorney, politician, and jurist.  He served 3 years as Chief Justice of the Supreme Court of the Idaho Territory (1885–1888), and earlier in his career served one term in the Wisconsin State Assembly (1867).

Early life and education 
Born in Crawford County, Pennsylvania, Hays moved with his family to Ashippun, Wisconsin Territory, in 1847. He attended the University of Wisconsin and studied law in Horicon, Wisconsin. He married Permelia Elizabeth Hubbard (1844–1928) in 1863.

Career 
In Wisconsin, Hays served as Clerk of the Wisconsin circuit court in Dodge County, and was admitted to the Wisconsin Bar in 1865.  While living in Juneau, Wisconsin, Hays served in the Wisconsin State Assembly in 1867.  He then served as the district attorney of Dodge County in 1874.  He was an unsuccessful candidate for Secretary of State of Wisconsin in 1877.

In 1885, Hayes was appointed Chief Justice of the Idaho Territorial Supreme Court.  Hugh W. Weir replaced Hays and became chief justice in 1888.

Personal life 
Hays died in Boise, Idaho Territory, while still in office and was buried in Wisconsin. Hays' eldest son, Samuel H. Hays, was a politician and attorney who served as the mayor of Boise, Idaho, and 29th Idaho Attorney General.

References

External links

1838 births
1888 deaths
People from Crawford County, Pennsylvania
People from Ashippun, Wisconsin
University of Wisconsin–Madison alumni
Idaho Territory judges
County clerks in Wisconsin
Wisconsin lawyers
Members of the Wisconsin State Assembly
19th-century American politicians
People from Juneau, Wisconsin
19th-century American judges
19th-century American lawyers